The Guardian Bank Building (originally known as the New England Building and later known as the National City Bank Building) is a high-rise building on Euclid Avenue in downtown Cleveland, Ohio.

Description and history 
It was built in 1896 and stands adjacent to National City Center. The building was designed by the firm of Shepley, Rutan, and Coolidge and remodeled by Walker and Weeks in 1915. It was converted to a Holiday Inn Express in 1999, and added to the National Register of Historic Places on September 8, 2000.

In January 2010, Rosetta, the largest independent interactive agency in America, announced plans to move into the Guardian Bank Building. The plans, announced in conjunction with the signing of a 10-year lease, include stripping and remodeling the top five floors, building a new penthouse suite on the roof, and renaming the building. In March 2012, developers announced plans to convert five stories into 85 apartments.

See also
List of Registered Historic Places in Cleveland, Ohio
List of tallest buildings in Cleveland

References

External links

Holiday Inn Express Cleveland - Downtown

Commercial buildings on the National Register of Historic Places in Ohio
Skyscraper hotels in Cleveland
Commercial buildings completed in 1896
Apartment buildings in Cleveland
National Register of Historic Places in Cleveland, Ohio
Beaux-Arts architecture in Ohio